The 1994 West Virginia Mountaineers football team represented West Virginia University in the 1994 NCAA Division I-A football season. It was the Mountaineers' 102nd overall and 4th season as a member of the Big East Conference (Big East). The team was led by head coach Don Nehlen, in his 15th year, and played their home games at Mountaineer Field in Morgantown, West Virginia. They finished the season with a record of seven wins and six losses (7–6 overall, 4–3 in the Big East) and with a loss in the Carquest Bowl against South Carolina.

Schedule

Roster

Game summaries

vs. Nebraska (Kickoff Classic)

Team players in the NFL

References

West Virginia
West Virginia Mountaineers football seasons
West Virginia Mountaineers football